Renan Inestroza (born 4 December 1965) is a member of the National Congress of Honduras representing the National Party of Honduras.

References
 

1965 births
Living people
Deputies of the National Congress of Honduras
National Party of Honduras politicians
Place of birth missing (living people)